The 2nd BET Awards took place at the Kodak Theatre in Los Angeles, California on June 25, 2002. The awards recognized Americans in music, acting, sports, and other fields of entertainment over the past year. Comedian Steve Harvey and Cedric the Entertainer hosted the event for the second time.

Performances
 Yolanda Adams – "I'm Gonna Be Ready" and "Since the Last Time I Saw You" 
 Usher – "U Don't Have to Call"
 Nelly – "Hot in Herre"
 Mary J. Blige and Ja Rule – "Rainy Dayz"
 Ludacris – "Saturday (Oooh! Ooooh!)" and "Move Bitch" 
 Ja Rule and Charli Baltimore – "Down Ass Bitch"
 Chaka Khan – "Fantasy"
 Lil' Bow Wow – "Take Ya Home"
 B2K – "Uh Huh"
 Ashanti – "Foolish"/"Happy"

Winners and nominees

External links
 BET Awards website

BET Awards